John Keenan may refer to:
 John F. Keenan (born 1929), United States federal judge in New York
 John Keenan (bishop) (born 1964), Bishop of Paisley, Scotland
 John Keenan (Gaelic footballer) (born 1942), Irish retired sportsperson
 John Keenan (Medal of Honor) (c. 1840–1906), United States Army soldier during the Indian Wars
 John D. Keenan (born 1965), member of the Massachusetts House of Representatives
 John F. Keenan (state senator) (born 1964), member of the Massachusetts Senate
 John R. Keennan (1939–2015), baseball scout for the Los Angeles Dodgers club

Others
 John Keenan (Holby Blue), fictional character in the British television series Holby Blue

See also
 Jack Keenan (disambiguation)